William Perry  (died 1948) was an Anglican priest.

He was educated at  the University of Aberdeen,  he was ordained after a period of study at Edinburgh Theological College in 1894. He served curacies in Greenock and Edinburgh.
He was Vice-Principal of Edinburgh Theological College from  1897 to 1899. He was Principal of the  College of the Scottish Episcopal Church from 1912 to 1929; a Lecturer in Systematic Theology at Edinburgh University from 1921 (until his death); Dean of Edinburgh and Rector of Colinton from 1929 to 1939; Rector of Buckland, Gloucestershire from 1939 to 1940; and Canon in Residence at Edinburgh Cathedral from 1940 to 1947.

A prolific author, he died on 30 April 1948.

Notes

1948 deaths
Alumni of the University of Aberdeen
Alumni of Edinburgh Theological College
Scottish Episcopalian clergy
Academics of the University of Edinburgh
Provosts of St Andrew's Cathedral, Aberdeen
Deans of Edinburgh
Year of birth missing